Methylobacterium variabile  is a bacterium from the genus of Methylobacterium which has been isolated from drinking water in Spain.

References

Further reading

External links
Type strain of Methylobacterium variabile at BacDive -  the Bacterial Diversity Metadatabase

Hyphomicrobiales
Bacteria described in 2013